Uzun erişte  is a traditional pasta made on the Turkey. They are made from flour, eggs, milk, and salt. They are made adding egg, such as kesme, but their size is longer.

Mass production 
In Turkey, the pasta is mass produced by Filiz Makarna, Veronelli Makarna as Uzun erişte.

References

Turkish cuisine
Turkish pasta
Types of pasta